The Infinity Tour was a concert tour by the American rock band Journey. The tour was in support of their 1978 album Infinity which peaked at #21 on the Billboard 200.

Background
Sales for the album and the band's stature began to grow upon the beginning of the tour on January 20, 1978. Throughout March and April, the band would tour with both hard rock bands Van Halen and Montrose. Steve Perry remembered: "Van Halen was the opening act for the tour, they were a brand new band back then. We were doing 3,000-seat auditoriums and they were killing us every night. It was eye-opening. We were keeping up with them, but they were certainly making us be a better band. They were so musically simple." Tom Broderick, a sound mixer for Van Halen recalled that the members of Journey were off-put by Van Halen's meteoric performances on tour with them and began to undermine them by sabotaging the PA. 

The members of Journey would eventually end up meeting Montrose's drummer, Steve Smith, which released reports that there was tensions between Aynsley Dunbar and the band due to the change in music direction from the jazz fusion sound. Aynsley was also noted to have started playing erratically and talking derogatorily about the other members of Journey according to the band's manager Herbie Herbert. Reflecting on the tensions between Dunbar and the band, Neal Schon commented: "We would talk about it, and he'd say he'd be willing to simplify things. But we'd get out there, and after five shows he wasn't doing that at all."

The band would fly over to Europe to perform at the Pinkpop Festival in Holland. Critics who had watched the performance criticized the unfamiliar stage equipment, and called the performance 'shallow', commenting that Steve Perry's vocals were barely audible, and Aynsley's drum solo was 'clumsy' and 'boring'. Following the show in the Netherlands, the band embarked on a three-month tour, where they performed as headliners for the first time. As part of an artist development program by Columbia Records, the band would later perform a free concert to 33,000 fans at the performing arts center in Saratoga Springs on June 9.

The tour ended on September 2, 1978, which was the last time Aynsley Dunbar performed with the band. Montrose's drummer, Steve Smith, joined the band following Dunbar's departure. His first performance with Journey was in November at Super Jam II. The band later finished the year with a hometown gig on New Year's Eve with Blondie and Stoneground as supporting acts. It is one of their most successful tours to date, with notable performances like the show in Chicago with The Rolling Stones, the 1978 World Series of Rock Festival with Emerson, Lake & Palmer and Foreigner, and the show in California with Ted Nugent and AC/DC.

Reception
Reviewing the January 27–29 performances at the Old Waldorf, Jack McDonough noted the band as one of the most exciting English-influenced bands in San Francisco which was becoming extremely popular. He praised the band's sound as melodic, with an "enveloping rainbow feel", sounding almost a lot like both Queen and The Beatles, with a variety of songs from the album Infinity and the albums before. He took notice on the audience, which each show drawing out 3,600 fans.

Setlist 

Songs played overall
"Of a Lifetime"
"I Would Find You"
"Karma"
"Feeling That Way"
"Anytime"
"(I'm a) Road Runner" (Jr. Walker & The All Stars cover)
"Love Hurts" (The Everly Brothers cover)
"Hold On, I'm Comin'" (Sam & Dave cover)
"People Get Ready" (The Impressions cover)
"Show Me" (Joe Tex cover)
"Cross Road Blues" (Robert Johnson cover)
"Born Under a Bad Sign" (Booker T. & The MG's cover)
"Good Times" (Sam Cooke cover)
"Anyway"
"People"
"La Do Da"
"Can Do"
"Next"
"Winds of March"
"Blues Jam"
"Black Angel Blues" (Lucille Bogan cover)
"On a Saturday Nite"
"Wheel in the Sky"
"You're on Your Own"
"Look into the Future"
"She Makes Me Feel Alright"
"Lights"
Encore
"Patiently"
"Opened the Door"

Typical setlist
"Of a Lifetime"
"Karma"
"Feeling That Way"
"Anytime"
"La Do Da"
"Next"
"Winds of March"
"On a Saturday Nite"
"Wheel in the Sky"
"You're on Your Own"
"She Makes Me Feel Alright"
"Lights"

Tour dates 

Information
  Aynsley Dunbar's final performance with Journey.
  Steve Smith's debut performance as Journey's drummer.

Box office score data

Personnel 
 Steve Perry – lead vocals
 Neal Schon – guitars, backing vocals
 Ross Valory – bass, backing vocals
 Gregg Rolie – keyboards, lead and backing vocals
 Aynsley Dunbar – drums, percussion
 Steve Smith – drums, percussion

References

Sources

Journey (band) concert tours
1978 concert tours